Eugène Guillevic (Carnac, Morbihan, France, August 5, 1907 Carnac – March 19, 1997 Paris) was a French poet.  Professionally, he went by the single name Guillevic.

Life
He was born in the rocky landscape and marine environment of Brittany.  His father, a sailor, was a policeman and took him to Jeumont (Nord) in 1909, Saint-Jean-Brévelay (Morbihan) in 1912, and Ferrette (Haut-Rhin) in 1919.

After a BA in mathematics, he was placed by the exams of 1926, in the Administration of Registration (Alsace, Ardennes). Appointed in 1935 to Paris as senior editor at the Directorate General at the Ministry of Finance and Economic Affairs, he was assigned in 1942 to control the economy. He was from 1945 to 1947 in the Cabinets of Ministers Francis Billoux (National Economy) and Charles Tillon (Reconstruction). In 1947 after the ouster of Communist ministers, he returned to the Inspector General of Economics, where his work included studies of the economy and planning, until his retirement in 1967.

He was a pre-war friend of Jean Follain, who introduced him to the group Sagesse; he later belonged to the School of Rochefort.

He was a practicing Catholic for about thirty years.  He became a communist sympathizer during the Spanish Civil War, and in 1942 joined the Communist Party when he joined with Paul Éluard, and participated in the publications of the underground press (Pierre Seghers, Jean Lescure).

His poetry is concise, straightforward as rock, rough and generous, but still suggestive. His poetry is also characterized by its rejection of metaphors, in that he prefers comparisons which he considered less misleading.

Awards
 1976 Grand Award for Poetry of the Académie française
 1984 Grand National Prize for Poetry
 1988 Prix Goncourt for poetry

Works translated to English
 Geometries. Richard Sieburth (translator), Ugly Duckling Press, 2010.
 The Sea & Other Poems. Patricia Terry (Translator), Black Widow Press/Commonwealth Books, Inc., July 15, 2007, 
Carnac. John Montague (Translator), Bloodaxe Books December 2000, 
Selected Poems. Denise Levertov (Translator), 1968, New Directions NDP279, Library of Congress Catalog Card Number 74-88726

French works
  (1923–1938, work documents published in 1994)
 Requiem (1938, six poems not published by the author)
 , Gallimard, Paris, 1942.
 , with a lithography by Jean Dubuffet, Le Calligraphe, Paris 1946
 Fractures, Éditions de Minuit, collection , Paris 1947
 , Gallimard, Paris, 1947.
 , Gallimard, Paris, 1949.
 , Seghers, Paris, 1952; edition augmented by Envie de vivre, Seghers, Paris, 1985.
 31 sonnets, preface by Aragon, Gallimard, Paris, 1954 (collection the author had not wanted re-issued)
 Carnac, Gallimard, Paris, 1961.
 , Gallimard, Paris, 1963.
 , Gallimard, Paris, 1966.
 , Gallimard, Paris, 1967.
 , Gallimard, Paris, 1969.
 , Gallimard, Paris, 1970.
 , Editeurs français réunis, Paris, 1970.
 , Gallimard, Paris, 1973.
 , Gallimard, Paris, 1977.
 , Gallimard, Paris, 1979.
 , Gallimard, Paris, 1980.
 , Gallimard, Paris, 1981.
 , Les Bibliophiles de France, 1982
 , Gallimard, Paris, 1983.
 , Trois-Rivières, 1986.
 , Gallimard, Paris, 1987.
 , Gallimard, Paris, 1987.
 , Rouen, 1987
 , Gallimard, Paris, 1989.
 , Gallimard, Paris, 1990.
 Impacts, Deyrolle Editeur, Cognac, 1990.
 , Gallimard, Paris, 1993. 
 , Gallimard, Paris, 1996.
 , Fischbacher, Paris, 2001 (posthumous edition by Lucie Albertini-Guillevic and Jérôme Pellissier).
 , Gallimard, Paris, 2002.
 , Gallimard, Paris, 2004
 , Seghers Jeunesse, 2004,
 , Gallimard, Paris, 2007 (posthumous edition by Lucie Albertini-Guillevic), 810 p.
 , Seghers Jeunesse, 2008

Republished paperback editions
 , preface by Jacques Borel, 1968.
 , 1977.
 .
 , 1997.
 .
 , 2007.

References

External links

1907 births
1997 deaths
People from Carnac
Writers from Brittany
Former Roman Catholics
French communists
Prix Goncourt de la Poésie winners
Struga Poetry Evenings Golden Wreath laureates
20th-century French poets
French male poets